Victoria is an unincorporated community in Natchitoches Parish, Louisiana, United States.

History
Sawmill town that began small about 1882, was purchased by the Louisiana Longleaf Lumber Company in 1898, that had a sawmill in Fisher, and the population grew to 1500. The mill cut-out in 1936. Boise Cascade bought the mill in 1966.

Notes

Unincorporated communities in Natchitoches Parish, Louisiana
Unincorporated communities in Louisiana
Populated places in Ark-La-Tex